Te Paepae o Aotea, also known the Volkner Rocks (named after Carl Sylvius Völkner), are a group of andesitic rock stacks and pinnacles located  northwest of Whakaari/White Island in New Zealand's Bay of Plenty. They reach 113 metres above sea level from 400 metres below the sea floor, while the saddle separating them from Whakaari/White Island is over 200 metres deep.

Te Paepae o Aotea Marine Reserve was established around them in 2006. The area is popular with divers due to good visibility (35–40 m), spectacular scenery and colourful marine life.

The rocks and marine reserve are acccesible by boat. There are several boat ramps, boating facilities and charter boat services in Eastern Bay of Plenty.

History

According to oral history, Te Paepae o Aotea was used as a landmark to show land was close.

The rocks became culturally significant to Ngāti Awa and other iwi descending from the Mātaatua waka, as the departure place for the spirits of all their people. Spirits linger here, leaving the physical world and reuniting with the souls of the departed.

The marine reserve was established on 9 October 2006.

See also

 Marine reserves of New Zealand
 List of islands of New Zealand
 Desert island

References

External links
Te Paepae o Aotea Marine Reserve at the Department of Conservation
Press release about reserve, Minister of Conservation

Volcanoes of the Bay of Plenty Region
Islands of the Bay of Plenty Region
Taupō Volcanic Zone
Rock formations of New Zealand
Uninhabited islands of New Zealand